Hrachya Muradi Margaryan (November 23, 1999), Artashat, Armenia), Armenian wrestler, member of the Armenian freestyle wrestling team  European youth champion, master of sports international․

Biography
Hrachya Margaryan was born in November  23 1999. He studied  at the state Institute  of Physical  Culture in 2017-2021. In  2019 in the 64 kilogram weight category  Hrachya Margaryan became Armenias champion. He participated the in the Spanish  Pontevedra city which took place at the European Youth Championship. The Armenian wrestler beat the Ukrainian athlete in the final with a score of 11:0. Won a gold medal in the 61 kg weight category. On 2021-2022 he became a champion of Armenia. in 2022 Hrachya Margaryan won a silver medal at the Under-23 European Wrestling Championship held in Plovdiv, Bulgaria.

References

External links 
2022 Senior U23 European Championships
Wrestling U23 European Championships 2022 65kg FS Hrachya MARGARYAN (ARM) df Dominik LARITZ (SUI)
Ինչպես է հայկական փոքրիկ քաղաքի մարզադպրոցը չեմպիոն ըմբիշներ պատրաստում. Советский спорт-ի անդրադարձը

1999 births
Living people
Armenian male sport wrestlers
Armenian sport wrestlers
European Wrestling Champions